Liquid Interface is a symphony in four movements for electronica and orchestra by the American composer Mason Bates.  The work was commissioned by the National Symphony Orchestra and was premiered February 22, 2007 in Washington, D.C., with the orchestra led by conductor Leonard Slatkin.  The piece is dedicated to composer John Corigliano.

Composition

Style and inspiration
Bates first drew inspiration for the symphony from bodies of water.  Bates detailed this inception in the score program notes, writing:
The form of Liquid Interface thus follows the progression of water in a world of increasing global warming.  The third movement "Crescent City" also features a musical tribute to the city of New Orleans through the use of Dixieland swing.

Structure
Liquid Interface has a duration of roughly 25 minutes and is composed in four movements:
Glaciers Calving 
Scherzo Liquido
Crescent City
On the Wannsee

Instrumentation
Liquid Interface is scored for electronica and orchestra, comprising three flutes (all doubling piccolo), three oboes (3rd doubling English horn), three clarinets (3rd doubling bass clarinet and E-flat clarinet), three bassoons (3rd doubling contrabassoon), four French horns, three trumpets, two tenor trombones, bass trombone, tuba, three percussionists, harp, piano, and strings.

Reception
Reviewing the world premiere, Andrew Lindemann Malone of The Washington Post lauded the work, saying it "surpassed in sheer sonic beauty even the works by Mendelssohn and Tchaikovsky that rounded out the program."  Malone further remarked:
Joshua Kosman of the San Francisco Chronicle wrote, "the electronic parts of Liquid Interface are simultaneously noteworthy and yet not really the point of the exercise. They are, rather, one additional resource among many that Bates uses in service of a cogent and beautiful musical narrative."  Margaret Sandresky of the Winston-Salem Journal said, "Aside from the wide variety of electronic sound, his orchestration of the piece was dazzling."  John von Rhein of the Chicago Tribune also praised the piece, remarking:

References

 1
2007 compositions
21st-century classical music
Music commissioned by the National Symphony Orchestra